Korgon is a village in Batken Region of Kyrgyzstan. It is part of the Leylek District. Its population was 2,204 in 2021.

Nearby towns and villages include Churbek (10 km) and Katrang (8 km).  There is another Korgon in the Toktogul District of Jalal-Abad Region.

References

External links 
 Satellite map at Maplandia.com

Populated places in Batken Region